Progesterone oxime, or progesterone monoxime, is an oxime conjugate of progesterone and may refer to:

 Progesterone 3-oxime (3-(hydroxyimino)pregn-4-en-3-one)
 Progesterone 20-oxime (20-(hydroxyimino)pregn-4-en-3-one)

See also
 Progesterone dioxime
 Progestogen ester § Progestogen oximes
 List of progestogen esters § Oximes of progesterone derivatives
 Progesterone (medication) § Derivatives

Ketoximes
Pregnanes
Steroid oximes